Quantum Hi-Tech (is a food and food research company. It was founded in 2000 and listed on the Shenzhen Stock Exchange in 2010. Their products include oligosaccharides.

The company was named to the 2013 Forbes "small and medium listed companies in Asia" 200 list.

Products 
 Fructooligosaccharides (FOS)
 Galactooligosaccharides (GOS)

References

External links
 Quantum Hi-Tech (China) Biological Co., Ltd. third quarter report, 2015
 Quantum Hi-Tech (300149) announcement
 Quantum Hi-Tech the rules of procedure of the general meeting of shareholders (April 2015)

Chinese brands
Companies based in Guangdong
Chinese companies established in 2000
Food and drink companies of China
Online companies of China
Food and drink companies established in 2000